The Aurel Vlaicu Flight School is the Romanian Air Force Application School based at Boboc, Buzău County. It was formed in 1997. Since August 2004, as a result of the air force transformation and re-sizing, the Air Force Application School is the main applicational facility for the three main air force branches: air force, surface-to-air missile, and radars.

Structure
The "Aurel Vlaicu" Flight School has the following squadrons: 
1st School Squadron – operating IAK-52W/TW and IAR-316B Alouette III;
2nd School Squadron – operating IAR-99 Standard;;

References

External links
"Aurel Vlaicu" Flight School on Romanian Air Force official site

Romanian Air Force bases
Military units and formations established in 1997
Educational institutions established in 1997
1997 establishments in Romania